Lisa Harrow  (born 25 August 1943) is a New Zealand RADA-trained actress, noted for her roles in British theatre, films and television. She is perhaps best known for her portrayal of Nancy Astor in the British BBC television drama, Nancy Astor.

Early life 
Harrow was born in the Auckland suburb of Mount Eden on 25 August 1943, the daughter of Kennedy Mayo Harrow and Eleanor Joan Harrow (née Stacpoole). She studied at the University of Auckland, and later graduated from RADA in 1968, joining BBC Radio's Repertory Company.

Acting career

Theatre
Harrow's stage career started at the Royal Shakespeare Company; roles there included Olivia in John Barton's production of Twelfth Night opposite Judi Dench, and Portia in The Merchant of Venice opposite Patrick Stewart. Other leading roles in the UK theatre include Juliet opposite John Hurt's Romeo at the Belgrade Theatre in Coventry, and Ann Whitfield in Man and Superman opposite Peter O'Toole at the Theatre Royal, Haymarket.

Harrow has performed on stage all over America.  She took over the central role of Vivian Bearing in the Pulitzer Prize winning play Wit in its long-running off-Broadway production in New York City. She was named 2001 Performer of the Year in Pittsburgh for Medea. Other roles include: Raynevskya in The Cherry Orchard at Yale Rep and the Chautauqua Theatre Company, where she also played Kate Keller in All My Sons.  She played Creusa in the Washington Shakespeare Theatre Company's 3 October 2009–4/12/2009 production of Euripides's Ion.

Television and film
Harrow is known for playing Nancy Astor, the first woman to take her seat in the House of Commons, in the 1982 BBC drama Nancy Astor. It aired in the United States in the PBS series Masterpiece Theatre.

Her first film role was in the Italian film The Devil Is a Woman (1974) starring Glenda Jackson. Also in 1976, she featured in an episode of Space: 1999 as Anna Davies in 'The Testament of Arkadia'. Harrow played Helen Alderson in the film adaptation of James Herriot's book All Creatures Great and Small (1975), starring alongside Simon Ward and Anthony Hopkins. She reprised the role the following year in the sequel It Shouldn't Happen to a Vet, this time opposite John Alderton and Colin Blakely.

Harrow guest-starred in The Professionals as a formidable counsel arguing at a Court of Inquiry for the disbandment of CI5 in the second-season episode 'The Rack' (1978), written by Brian Clemens. She also starred in the BBC2 series 1990 as Deputy Controller Lynn Blake.

Harrow played journalist Kate Reynolds in the horror film Omen III: The Final Conflict (1981) starring Sam Neill, and worked with Neill again in Krzysztof Zanussi's film . She starred in the New Zealand film Shaker Run in 1985, and played Lizzie Dickinson in the BBC series Lizzie's Pictures (1987). She won the Australian Film Institute Award for Best Actress in a Leading Role for her performance in The Last Days of Chez Nous (1992).  In 1990, Harrow played the tart-tongued, ignored wife in a cunning family of rich brewers in Sins of the Father, Episode 13 of the Inspector Morse series for ITV, starring John Thaw. That year, she also starred in the ABC-TV miniseries adaptation of Come In Spinner, and played the role of Imogen Donahue in Agatha Christie's Poirot 'The Kidnapped Prime Minister'. Her most recent television performance in Britain was as Kavanagh's wife Lizzie in the series Kavanagh QC, also starring Thaw. She left the programme after the 3rd series (transmitted in 1997) to move to America.

In 2014, she played Marion in the New Zealand television series Step Dave.

In the 2015 New Year Honours, Harrow was appointed an Officer of the New Zealand Order of Merit for services to the dramatic arts.

Personal life 
In 1980, Harrow met Sam Neill while filming Omen III: The Final Conflict (1981) and the two have a son together. 

She is married to whale biologist Roger Payne, and lives in Vermont, US. Payne is founder and President of Ocean Alliance. He and Scott McVay discovered the long, complex and apparently random sounds produced by male humpback whales are actually rhythmic, repeated sequences, and therefore, are properly called 'whale songs'. The couple have created a lecture/performance piece called "SeaChange: Reversing the Tide".

Author 
Harrow is the author of the environmental handbook What Can I Do?, published in separate editions for Australia, New Zealand, the UK and the United States. She has a website to promote the book. The U.S. edition:
 (pbk. : alk. paper) Includes bibliographical references.

Honours
In the 2015 New Year Honours, Harrow was appointed an Officer of the New Zealand Order of Merit, for services to the dramatic arts.

Filmography
 The Devil Is a Woman (1974) as Emilia Contreas
 Space: 1999 - Episode : 'The Testament of Arkadia' (1975 – TV) as Anna Davis 
 All Creatures Great and Small (1975 – TV) as Helen
 It Shouldn't Happen to a Vet (1976) as Helen
 Star Maidens (1976 – TV) as Dr Liz Becker
 1990 (1978 – TV) as Lynn Blake
 The Look (1978 – TV) as Sonny
 Dr. Jekyll and Mr. Hyde (1980 – TV) as Ann Coggeshall
 Omen III: The Final Conflict (1981) as Kate Reynolds
  (1981) as Wanda
 Nancy Astor (1982 – TV) as Nancy Astor
 Man and Superman (1982 – TV) as Ann Whitefield
 Other Halves (1984) as Liz
 Shaker Run (1985) as Dr. Christine Rubin
 Lizzie's Pictures (1987 – TV) as Lizzie Dickinson
 Act of Betrayal (1988 – TV) as Eileen McGurk
 Always Afternoon (1988 – TV) as Nancy Kennon
 Nonni and Manni (1988–89 – TV) as Sigrid Jónsdóttir
 Come In Spinner (1990 – TV) as Claire Jeffries
 Inspector Morse: 'The Sins of the Fathers' (1990 – TV) as Thelma Radford
 The Last Days of Chez Nous (1992) as Beth
 Agatha Christie's Poirot: 'The Kidnapped Prime Minister'  (1990) as Mrs. Daniels
 That Eye, the Sky (1994) as Alice Flack
 Kavanagh QC (1995–97 – TV) as Lizzie Kavanagh
 Sunday (1997) as Madeleine Vesey
 Country (2000) as Miriam
 Jessica (2004 – TV) as Hester Bergman
 Red Knot (2014) as Lisa Harrow
 Step Dave (2014 – TV) as Marion Gray
 Henry (2017) as Joanna
 The Brokenwood Mysteries: 'Exposed To The Light' (2021 – TV) as Charlotte Chambers
 Blind Bitter Happiness Pilot (2021 – TV) as Grandma Magsie
 Destination Love (2021 – TV) as Katherine

References

External links

Lisa Harrow | Biography, Photos, Movies, TV, Credits | Hollywood.com

1943 births
Living people
New Zealand stage actresses
New Zealand film actresses
New Zealand television actresses
Non-fiction environmental writers
People from Auckland
Alumni of RADA
University of Auckland alumni
People from Windsor County, Vermont
Best Actress AACTA Award winners
Officers of the New Zealand Order of Merit